Amy Dacey is an American Democratic politician. She was the CEO of the Democratic National Committee from January 2014 until her resignation in August 2016.

Early years and education 

Amy Dacey graduated from Auburn High School in Cayuga County, New York in 1989.  She received her BA in Political Science and History from the Binghamton University in 1993, and a Masters in Political Science from American University.

Career 

Dacey began her career at the National Foundation of Women Legislators.  During the 2000 election cycle she was the Deputy Political Director of the Democratic Congressional Campaign Committee.  She then served as the Deputy Political Director on the Democratic Senatorial Committee for the 2002 election cycle; the National Political Director of Keeping America’s Promise, a political action committee affiliated with Democrat John Kerry; the Director of Government Relations at the Service Employees International Union (SEIU); and in 2004 Dacey worked as the special assistant to John Kerry during his 2004 presidential campaign.  During the campaign Dacey acted as the Traveling Political Director. During the 2006 election year she worked as the National Political Director for Senator John Kerry’s national leadership PAC.  In 2010 Dacey took the job of Executive Director at EMILY's List, an American political action committee that works to elect female Democrats.

She has worked on the political campaigns of Louise Slaughter and Maurice Hinchey.

Democratic National Committee 
DNC Chairwoman Debbie Wasserman Schultz appointed Dacey to the post of CEO of the DNC in October 2013, and began her work for the DNC in January 2014.

In 2016, WikiLeaks published an email in which Dacey responded "AMEN" to an email from colleague Bradley Marshall, in which Marshall expressed the belief that Bernie Sanders "is an atheist" (rather than a Jew) and that this could be used as a political issue against him in the Kentucky and West Virginia primaries. Dacey subsequently resigned as CEO of the DNC after the email was published.

Awards and recognition 

In 2014, Dacey was inducted into the Auburn Education Foundation's Hall of Distinction.  In March 2014, Dacey was the headline speaker at the Democratic Women of Cayuga County’s annual spring brunch in Auburn, New York.

See also 
Democratic Congressional Campaign Committee cyber attacks
2016 Democratic National Committee email leak

References 

New York (state) Democrats
American women in politics
Binghamton University alumni
American University School of Public Affairs alumni
Living people
Year of birth missing (living people)
Politicians from Auburn, New York
Place of birth missing (living people)
Democratic National Committee people
Auburn High School (Auburn, New York) alumni
21st-century American women